The women's heptathlon at the 2012 African Championships in Athletics was held at the Stade Charles de Gaulle on 29 and 30 June.

Medalists

Records

Schedule

Results

110 metres hurdles

High jump

Shot put

200 metres

Long jump

Javelin throw

800 metres

Final standings

References

Results

Heptathlon
Combined events at the African Championships in Athletics
2012 in women's athletics